The Universal Magazine of Knowledge and Pleasure was a periodical published in London in the period 1747–1814 by John Hinton and W. Bent. It advertised itself as dealing with "Letters, Debates, Essays, Tales, Poetry, History, Biography, Antiquities, Voyages, Travels, Astronomy, Geography, Mathematics, Mechanics, Architecture, Philosophy, Medicine, Chemistry, Husbandry, Gardening and other Arts and Sciences; which may render it Instructive and Entertaining. To which will be added An Impartial Account of Books in several Languages, And of the state of Learning in Europe; also Of the New Theatrical Entertainments." The magazine was published under Royal Licence according to an Act of Parliament obtained by Hinton.

See also
The Universal Magazine (1900 monthly)
List of 18th-century British periodicals

References

Sources

External links

Catalog Record: The Universal magazine of knowledge and pleasure  Hathi Trust Digital Library

1747 establishments in England
1814 disestablishments in England
Monthly magazines published in the United Kingdom
Defunct magazines published in the United Kingdom
Magazines published in London
Magazines established in 1747
Magazines disestablished in 1814
1740s in London